Checheno-Ingush Autonomous Oblast was an autonomous oblast of the Russian SFSR, Soviet Union, created on January 15, 1934 by merging the Chechen and Ingush Autonomous Oblasts.

It was elevated in status to the Checheno-Ingush Autonomous Soviet Socialist Republic on December 5, 1936.

States and territories established in 1934
States and territories disestablished in 1936
1934 establishments in the Soviet Union
1936 disestablishments in the Soviet Union
Autonomous oblasts of the Soviet Union
Politics of Chechnya
History of Chechnya
Politics of Ingushetia
History of Ingushetia